The Fiat Doblò is a panel van and leisure activity vehicle produced by Italian automaker Fiat since 2000. It was unveiled at the Paris Motor Show in October 2000. A second-generation Doblò succeeded the original vehicle in 2010 for most markets, and it was sold in the United States as the RAM ProMaster City from 2015 to 2022. The third-generation Doblò, a rebadged version of the Citroën Berlingo, was unveiled in June 2022.

First generation (2000)

It was first launched to the public in the Netherlands, and received the "2006 International Van of the Year" award by an international jury from 19 countries. In Singapore, a 1.4 litre LAV variant is marketed as the Fiat Panorama in five and seven seater versions. The first Doblò was sold in January 2001.

The Doblò uses Fiat Strada's platform, in turn derived from the Fiat Palio's one, using a rigid axle with leaf springs at the rear, instead of a torsion beam with coil springs as on the Palio.

It is manufactured by Fiat's Tofaş subsidiary factory in Bursa, Turkey, in Brazil since 2002 and in Russia and Vietnam. Turkish models have an engine range that includes a 1.4 litre petrol, a 1.9 litre MultiJet, and a 16 valve 1.3 litre MultiJet.

In North Korea, Pyonghwa Motors produces Doblò branded as its own name Ppeokkugi. 

The facelift version came in October 2005, and was restyled with modifications to the front and rear light groups, and the total design of the front part.

Brazilian Doblò 
Launched in 2002, the Brazilian Doblòs were initially available with two 16 valve petrol engines, a 1.3 litre Fire and a 1.6 litre Torque. From 2004 to 2009, the only engine available in Brazil was an 8 valve 1.8 litre Ecotec, supplied by General Motors do Brasil. This engine was produced initially in a petrol version, and later as flex fuel.

In September 2003, Fiat Brazil introduced an off road 4x2 version called Fiat Doblò Adventure, also with the straight-4 Ecotec 1800 cc engine. It has revised exterior look with bigger bumpers and mouldings and raised ride height  and spare wheel on the rear.

In 2009, the whole Adventure line (Doblò, Idea, Strada and Palio Weekend) was equipped with a locking differential. The line was rebadged as Adventure Locker. Only in the model year of 2010, the Brazilian Doblò and the Doblò Adventure were updated with the European facelift of 2005.

Besides the 1.8 litre Powertrain, Doblò is now equipped with a 1.4 litre Fire flex engine. In the model year of 2011, the 8 valve 1.8 litre Ecotec engine was replaced by the brand new 16 valve 1.8 litre E.torQ engine, produced by Fiat Powertrain Technologies.

The Brazilian Doblò was discontinued in December 2021 after 160,000 units had been assembled. Slow sales meant that meeting the upcoming Proconve L7 emissions standards would not be viable.

Engines

2000–2006

2006–2009

Electric versions 
Micro-Vett Fiat Doblò has three battery versions:
 Go Green, an 18 kWh Altairnano lithium-ion NanoSafe battery pack. The battery pack can be fully recharged in less than ten minutes using AeroVironment's high voltage, 125 kW rated, rapid charging system.
 60 x 200 AH 3.6V lithium modules; Battery life: 1000 cycles at 80% DOD / 2000 cycles at 70% DOD

The vehicle uses a 30 kW (60 kW peak) motor from Ansaldo Electric Drives (a S.p.A. based in Genoa), that gives  top speed.

On October 2, 2007, a sixty day demonstration of the All-Electric Fiat Doblo was begun. The Electric engine is powered by a custom 18 kWh Altairnano high performance NanoSafe(R) battery pack, travelled  in an urban delivery circuit.

The custom battery pack was fully recharged in less than ten minutes a total of three times using AeroViroments' high voltage, 125 kW rated, rapid charging system.

Second generation (2010)

The all new Doblò (Type 263) was launched in the beginning of 2010, and it is built in Turkey by Tofaş. The 2010 Doblò uses the Fiat Small platform, derived from the Grande Punto, with a new bi link independent rear suspension instead of a torsion beam, which has  wheelbase,  luggage compartment, and low CO2 emissions (129 g/km with the 1.3 Multijet  engine). The Doblò was also sold by Opel and Vauxhall as the Combo.

 the Doblò is available as a pickup called Fiat Doblò Work Up or Fiat Pratico in Turkey. There is also a raised roof version, as well as an extended wheelbase van called the "Doblò Cargo Maxi".

These two features are combined for the Fiat Doblò Cargo XL, a high roofed, long wheelbase panel van model, with a one tonne payload, equipped with the  1.6 litre Multijet common rail diesel. The XL, which can carry as much as the bigger and more expensive Scudo, was presented in the United Kingdom in May 2013.

In other markets the XL appeared in 2012, and it is available with all diesel engines excepting the 1.3, and also the 1.4 T-Jet. There is also an XL Combi, with a  version of the 2.0 diesel.

Doblò EV 
In February 2010, Tofaş announced they were developing a battery-electric version of the Doblò (263). The vehicle itself was introduced publicly in July 2010, as "The First Commercial Electrical Vehicle Developed in Turkey". It also was revealed that Tofaş will lead FIAT's development of electric light commercial vehicles (LCV). During a ceremony to commemorate the production of the millionth Doblò, the Doblò EV was tested by press and Turkish Minister of Industry and Commerce, Nihat Ergün. In November 2018, the first Doblò EV was delivered to the Turkish fashion company, Vakko.

The 30 kWh battery is located in the rear floor. Overall the Doblò EV weighs  more than the Cargo 1.6 Multijet version.

Facelift 

Introduced at the Hanover Motor Show, the 2015 Fiat Doblò receives a revised front end with an all new dashboard, new headlamps, grille, and front bumper to coincide with the release of the Ram ProMaster City.

Versions include standard, Active, SX and Technico for the commercial versions and Pop, Easy, Lounge and Trekking for the passenger (MPV) models. When the Doblo was crash tested by NCAP in 2017 it received a safety rating of 3 out of 5 stars.

For the 2019 model year the Doblo MPV is no longer available for the U.K market.
The N1 Fiat professional commercial version remains on sale although the 1.4 Petrol engine has been discontinued, with only 1.3 and 1.6 Diesel options available for the U.K. This model can be specified as a passenger variant with factory windows and seats and either a rear tailgate or the van style double rear doors.

In 2020 the MPV version of the Fiat Doblo ceased production for most markets. As of 2022, the Doblo MPV remains on sale in some markets, including the Turkish and Russian markets, as the Doblo Panorama. The Doblo Cargo van also remains in production - albeit with more limited engine options than previously.

In September 2022, the second generation Dobló was discontinued in Europe and it was replaced by the third generation, which is a rebadged version of a third generation Citroën Berlingo. 

Late 2022, the second generation Dobló stopped to be exported, but it remained in production for 2023 in Turkey.

Ram ProMaster City 

The Ram ProMaster City (Type 636) is an Americanised version of the Fiat Doblò introduced in the model year of 2015, to succeed the Dodge Caravan based C/V Tradesman. The ProMaster City is built in the same plant in Turkey as the Doblò and exported to North America. To circumvent the chicken tax, only passenger vans are imported into North America, with cargo vans being post import conversions.

Unlike the Doblò, passenger versions of the ProMaster City use solid metal panels instead of glass in its rear quarters, and third row seating and the lift tailgate options are not offered. The 2.4 litre Tigershark engine mated to the 948TE nine speed automatic transmission is the only power train available for the ProMaster City.

Trim levels are Tradesman, SLT, Wagon, and Wagon SLT. Like the larger Ram ProMaster, the Ram ProMaster City received a facelift for the model year of 2019. The front "crosshair" grille was replaced with a plain front grille with the 'RAM' lettering.

The interior of the facelifted 2019 Ram ProMaster City remains largely unchanged from 2018, although the U Connect 3 5.0BT touchscreen radio is now standard equipment (both GPS navigation and SiriusXM Satellite Radio still remain options), replacing the previously standard U Connect 3.0 non touchscreen radio on models from 2018. This is due to the National Highway Traffic Safety Administration (NHTSA) regulation of standard rear view backup cameras for the model year of 2019. Now standard are a USB input as well as U Connect Bluetooth hands free calling and wireless A2DP audio streaming, as well as voice control.

Stellantis plans to discontinue the ProMaster City after the 2022 model year, citing declining annual sales for compact commercial vans in the US and Canadian markets. Shipments of the van from Turkey to the United States and Canada will continue until the end of the first quarter of 2023.

Engines 

 Only for Ram ProMaster City

Third generation (K9; 2022) 

The third-generation Doblò was released in June 2022 as a rebadged version of the third-generation Citroën Berlingo, with a battery electric version in offer as the e-Doblò. The model is produced in Spain alongside its stablemates, as well as in the Stellantis Mangualde Plant in Mangualde, Portugal.

References

External links 

 Fiat Doblò Official UK Page
 Fiat Professional UK
 Ram ProMaster City Official Page

Doblo
Vans
Euro NCAP small MPVs
2000s cars
Vehicles introduced in 2000
All-wheel-drive vehicles
Production electric cars
Flexible-fuel vehicles
Cars of Turkey
Cars of Brazil
2010s cars
Fiat electric vehicles